Chrysanthemum japonense (also known as ashizuri noji-giku Ashizuri (Japanese) meaning "Point wild roadside daisy"  or gold / silver chrysanthemum in English) is a flowering plant within the genus Chrysanthemum of the family Asteraceae. It has 27 pairs of chromosomes. A perennial flowering plant, it has leaves between 3–5 cm in length and flower heads that are 3–4.5 cm with white petals. Typically, flowering occurs in October to December annually. It the floral emblem of Hyōgo Prefecture.

Distribution
Currently it is classified as semi-endangered. Native only in Japan. It is naturally found in Shikoku (coastal area of Kochi prefecture and Ehime prefecture).

Industrial uses
It is used in the manufacture of nojigiku alcohol.

References

http://www.toshiba.co.jp/env/en/global_env_action/jp/064.htm

http://flowers.la.coocan.jp/Asteraceae/Chrysanthemum%20japonense%20ashizuriense.htm

japonense